The 1973 Appalachian State Mountaineers football team was an American football team that represented Appalachian State University as a member of the Southern Conference (SoCon) during the 1973 NCAA Division I football season. In their third year under head coach Jim Brakefield, the Mountaineers compiled an overall record of 3–7–1 with a mark of 2–2 in conference play, and finished fifth in the SoCon.

Schedule

References

Appalachian State
Appalachian State Mountaineers football seasons
Appalachian State Mountaineers football